Schoenia cassiniana (common name - Pink everlasting) is a species of plant in the tribe Gnaphalieae within the family Asteraceae, native to Western Australia, South Australia and the Northern Territory. It was first described in 1829 by Charles Gaudichaud-Beaupré as Helichrysum cassinianum, but was transferred to the genus Schoenia in 1845 by Joachim Steetz.

It is an annual herb, growing to heights of 7 cm to 70 cm on sandy, loamy, clay and stony soils. Its pink and yellow flowers may be seen from June to November.

Gallery

References

External links
Schoenia cassiniana Photo gallery at iNaturalist
Schoenia cassiniana occurrence data from GBIF

Gnaphalieae
Endemic flora of Australia
Taxa named by Charles Gaudichaud-Beaupré
Plants described in 1829